Delia arambourgi is a species of fly in the family Anthomyiidae. It is a pest of teff and pearl millet in Ethiopia.

References

Anthomyiidae
Insect pests of millets